Oak Hill Cemetery is located on Route 81 in Durham, Greene County, New York. This 5.6-acre cemetery originated as the burial place of early settlers Lucas and Deborah DeWitt on their family farm in the early 1820s, and evolved into a community cemetery for local residents.

This cemetery is on the National Register of Historic Places.

See also
 National Register of Historic Places listings in Greene County, New York

References

External links 
 
 Oak Hill Cemetery at New York Gravestones

Cemeteries on the National Register of Historic Places in New York (state)
Cemeteries in Greene County, New York
National Register of Historic Places in Greene County, New York